Westat is an employee-owned professional services corporation located in Rockville, Maryland, USA. It provides research services to agencies of the U.S. Government, as well as businesses,  foundations, and state and local governments. The corporation conducts research studies in behavioral health & health policy, clinical trials, education, public health & epidemiology, social policy & economics and transportation.

History
Westat Inc. began as a partnership in 1961 with co-founders Edward C. Bryant, Ph.D., a tenured full professor of statistics at the University of Wyoming, and two former students, James Daley and Donald King. In 1963, the company was incorporated. Dr. Bryant served as the company's first president until 1978, when Joseph Hunt took over as president for the next 32 years. In 1981, Westat moved to its present location in Rockville, Maryland and today maintains staff in the U.S., China, Costa Rica, Ethiopia, India, South Africa and Thailand.

In May 2011, James E. Smith, Ph.D., became president and CEO of the company. Graham Kalton, Ph.D., stepped down as chairman of the board in 2019, and was replaced by Smith. Scott Royal, Ph.D., became the CEO and President of the company in March 2020.

Recent acquisitions 
Westat acquired education research and technical assistance specialist, Edvance Research in January 2016 and healthcare data analytics firm, JEN Associates in February 2018, both for an undisclosed amount.

In June 2022, the company acquired Insight Policy Research (Insight) which operates as a wholly owned subsidiary of Westat, known as 'Westat Insight'.

Research activities
Westat conducts studies on respondent knowledge, attitudes, and behaviors, program evaluation, physical, mental, and behavioral health, academic achievement and literacy, early childhood longitudinal studies, child abuse and neglect, medical treatments and outcomes, exposure assessments, and information management and communications solutions. The company supports two software packages, WesVar and Blaise. The former is a variance estimation software while the latter is a survey processing system.

The company also has a life sciences division that focuses on supporting clinical trials and research on vaccines, pediatric studies, rare and emerging disease, oncology, and infectious diseases for the biopharmaceutical industry. The company also conducts research on COVID-19 and vaccines. The company also conducted an analysis on pedestrian deaths in association with Governors Highway Safety Association (GHSA), in April 2022.

Corporate structure
Westat is employee-owned. All employees can earn a share of ownership through the Westat Employee Stock Ownership Plan (ESOP). Since the introduction of the plan in 1977, the value of employee holdings has grown.

Recognition and claims
Westat was the recipient of the Policy Impact Award by the American Association for Public Opinion Research in 2011 and 2014, for work for survey work related to “Don’t Ask Don’t Tell” and the National Prison Rape Statistics Program, respectively.

In September 2014, Department of Labor’s Office of Federal Contract Compliance Programs discovered, during a scheduled audit of Westat, that the company systematically failed to provide equal employment opportunities to women applicants and applicants with other ethnicities for various positions between the period of October 2008 to September 2009. Under the terms of the settlement, Westat paid $1,500,000 in back wages and interest to all affected applicants, made 113 job offers to the original class members as positions become available, corrected record-keeping violations and conducted internal audits.

Westat ranked #86 in the 2019 Top 100 companies by Washington Technology. The company has also been included in Forbes magazine's annual ranking of America's Best Employers For Diversity, Best Employers for Women, Best Employers for Veterans and Best-in-State Employers. In 2022, it has been named a Great Place to Work.

References

External links
Westat home page

Business services companies of the United States
Companies based in Rockville, Maryland
Employee-owned companies of the United States
Employment discrimination
American companies established in 1963
Business services companies established in 1963